is an interchange railway station in the city of Kakegawa, Shizuoka Prefecture, Japan, jointly operated by Central Japan Railway Company (JR Tōkai). It is connected to the adjacent Tenryū-Hamanako Railway Kakegawa Station, which is located in a separate building.

Lines 
Kakegawa Station is served by the Tōkaidō Shinkansen and the Tōkaidō Main Line and is 229.3 kilometers from Tokyo Station. It is also the terminus for the Tenryū Hamanako Railroad Tenryū Hamanako Line and is located 67.7 kilometers from the opposing terminus at Shinjohara Station.

Layout
JR Kakegawa Station has five platforms serving eight tracks. The Tōkaidō Main Line Track 1 is served by a side platform connected to the main station building's north exit and the Tenryū Hamanako Line station. It is used for departing both east and west. Track 2 and Track 3 are served by an island platform. Both platforms are connected to the station building by an underpass, which also connects to the two elevated side platforms used by the Shinkansen (Track 4 and Track 5, with two additional centre tracks for non-stop passing trains). The north side of the station is a wooden structure dating from 1940. The station building has automated ticket machines, TOICA automated turnstiles and a staffed ticket office.

Platforms

Transfers

Transfer is available from the JR line to the Tenryū Hamanako Line, whose terminus bay platform is in a separate building adjacent to the north exit of the JR station.

Adjacent stations

History
Kakegawa Station was first opened on April 16, 1889 when the section of the Tōkaidō Main Line connecting Shizuoka with Hamamatsu was completed. In 1935 the first section of the Tenryū Hamanako Line opened, with Kakegawa Station as its terminus. On March 13, 1988 the Tōkaidō Shinkansen platforms opened on the south side of the station.

Station numbering was introduced to the section of the Tōkaidō Line operated JR Central in March 2018; Kakegawa Station was assigned station number CA27.

Passenger statistics
In fiscal 2017, the local portion of the station was used by an average of 11,292 passengers daily (boarding passengers only) and the Tenryū Hamanako portion was used by 995 passengers daily.

Surrounding area
 Kakegawa Castle

See also
 List of railway stations in Japan

References

Yoshikawa, Fumio. Tokaido-sen 130-nen no ayumi. Grand-Prix Publishing (2002) .

External links

 JR Central station information 
 Tenryū Hamanako Railroad Station information 

Stations of Central Japan Railway Company
Railway stations in Shizuoka Prefecture
Railway stations in Japan opened in 1889
Tōkaidō Main Line
Tōkaidō Shinkansen
Stations of Tenryū Hamanako Railroad
Railway stations in Japan opened in 1925
Kakegawa, Shizuoka